Kam Lar (also Romanized as Kamalar, Kamlar, Kemlar, and Komlar; also known as Komeh Lar and Kimlar) is a village in Qeshlaqat-e Afshar Rural District, Afshar District, Khodabandeh County, Zanjan Province, Iran. At the 2006 census, its population was 31, in 7 families.

References 

Populated places in Khodabandeh County